Vaqfi may refer to:
 Vaqfi, Chaharmahal and Bakhtiari
 Vaqfi, Gilan